Polyipnus clarus, commonly known as the stareye hatchetfish or slope hatchetfish, is a species of ray-finned fish in the family Sternoptychidae. It occurs in deep water in the western Atlantic Ocean from the Gulf of Maine southward to the Caribbean Sea and the Gulf of Mexico.

Description
The mouth is nearly vertical, the snout is short and the eyes are large, laterally-facing and non-tubular. The dorsal surface is dark with a triangular bar and the flanks silvery. There are photophores behind and below the eye, on the flanks and belly.

Status
Polyipnus clarus is a common mesopelagic, demersal, shoaling species and faces no particular threats. For these reasons, the International Union for Conservation of Nature has assessed its conservation status as being of "least concern".

References

Sternoptychidae
Fish of the Eastern United States
Fish of the Western Atlantic
Fish described in 1994